Mae Charim National Park, also known as Mae Jarim, is a protected area in the Luang Prabang Range, Nan Province, Northern Thailand. The Wa River, a popular river for white water rafting between July and December, flows through the park area. The park was established on 6 July 2007 with an area of 270,000 rai ~ . Mae Charim National Park is part of the Luang Prabang montane rain forests ecoregion.

1,652 m high Doi Khun Lan is the highest peak within the park perimeter. There are said to be yetis in the area.

See also
Thai highlands
List of national parks of Thailand
List of Protected Areas Regional Offices of Thailand

References

External links
TH009 Mae Jarim Wildlife Sanctuary

National parks of Thailand
Protected areas established in 1961
Luang Prabang Range
Tourist attractions in Nan province
1961 establishments in Thailand
Phi Pan Nam Range